Wumpa may refer to:
Wumpa's World, a cartoon
Wumpa fruit, a fictional fruit in the Crash Bandicoot video game series